Felix Gilbert (May 21, 1905 – February 14, 1991) was a German-born American historian of early modern and modern Europe. 
Gilbert was born in Baden-Baden, Germany, to a middle-class Jewish family, and part of the Mendelssohn Bartholdy clan. In the latter half of the 1920s, Gilbert studied under Friedrich Meinecke at the University of Berlin. Gilbert's area of expertise was the Renaissance, especially the diplomatic history of the period He was a fellow of the Institute for Advanced Study in Princeton from 1962 to 1975, and maintained an active involvement as an emeritus faculty member until his death in 1991. He was elected to the American Academy of Arts and Sciences in 1963 and the American Philosophical Society in 1969.

The main reading room of the German Historical Institute in Washington, D.C. is named in his honor.

Work
Johann Gustav Droysen und die preussisch-deutsche Frage, diss., Berlin 1931.
Makers of Modern Strategy: Military Thought from Machiavelli to Hitler, (co-edited with Edward M. Earle and Gordon A. Craig) Princeton, N.J. 1943; New York 1966, 1971.
"Bernardo Rucellai and the Orti Oricellari: A Study on the Origin of Modern Political Thought". In: Journal of the Warburg and Courtauld Institutes, Volume 12, 1949, p. 101–131.
The Diplomats, 1919–1939, (co-edited with Gordon A. Craig), Princeton, N.J. 1954; New York 1963.
To the Farewell Address: Ideas of Early American Foreign Policy, Princeton, N.J. 1961. (winner of the 1962 Bancroft Prize).
Machiavelli and Guicciardini: Politics and History in Sixteenth-Century Florence, Princeton, N.J. 1965.

History: Choice and Commitment, Cambridge, Massachusetts 1977.
The Pope, His Banker, and Venice, Cambridge, Massachusetts 1981.
A European Past: Memoirs, 1905-1945, 1988.
History: Politics or Culture? Reflections on Ranke and Burckhardt, 1990.

Further reading

 Craig, Gordon, "Insight and Energy: Reflections on the Work of Felix Gilbert," in Felix Gilbert as Scholar and Teacher, ed. Hartmut Lehmann, Washington D.C.: German Historical Institute, Occasional Paper no. 6,1992.
 Daum, Andreas, Hartmut Lehmann, James Sheehan (eds.), The Second Generation: Émigrés from Nazi Germany as Historians. With a Biobibliographic Guide. New York: Berghahn Books, 2016, .
 Lehmann, Hartmut and James J. Sheehan (eds.), An Interrupted Past: German-Speaking Refugee Historians in the United States after 1933. Washington, D.C.: German Historical Institute, 1991. 
 Thompson, Bruce  "Gilbert, Felix" pages 465–466 from The Encyclopedia of Historians and Historical Writing, Volume 1, edited by Kelly Boyd, London: Fitzroy Dearborn Publishing, 1999.

Endnotes

1905 births
1991 deaths
American people of German-Jewish descent
German emigrants to the United States
Jewish American historians
20th-century American historians
American male non-fiction writers
Institute for Advanced Study faculty
People from Baden-Baden
Recipients of the Pour le Mérite (civil class)
Bancroft Prize winners
20th-century American male writers
Corresponding Fellows of the British Academy
20th-century American Jews

Members of the American Philosophical Society